Allen Township is one of thirty-seven townships in La Salle County, Illinois, USA.  As of the 2010 census, its population was 584 and it contained 259 housing units. Allen Township was formed from Bruce Township on an unknown date. The township bears the name of Allen Stevens, a pioneer settler.

Geography

Cities, towns, villages
 Ransom

Cemeteries
The township contains these two cemeteries: Allen and Saint Patrick's Catholic.

Demographics

Political districts
 Illinois's 11th congressional district
 State House District 75
 State Senate District 38

References
 
 United States Census Bureau 2009 TIGER/Line Shapefiles
 United States National Atlas

External links
 City-Data.com
 Illinois State Archives
 Township Officials of Illinois

Townships in LaSalle County, Illinois
Populated places established in 1849
Townships in Illinois
1849 establishments in Illinois